Cereus forbesii is a species of columnar cactus whose native range is Bolivia to N. Central Argentina.

References

External links
 
 

forbesii